The 2010–11 season was the 65th season in Rijeka's history. It was their 20th season in the Prva HNL and 37th successive top tier season.

Competitions

Prva HNL

Classification

Results summary

Results by round

Matches

Prva HNL

Source: HRnogomet.com

Croatian Cup

Source: HRnogomet.com

Squad statistics
Competitive matches only.  Appearances in brackets indicate numbers of times the player came on as a substitute.

See also
2010–11 Prva HNL
2010–11 Croatian Cup

References

External sources
 2010–11 Prva HNL at HRnogomet.com
 2010–11 Croatian Cup at HRnogomet.com 
 Prvenstvo 2010.-2011. at nk-rijeka.hr

HNK Rijeka seasons
Rijeka